Cronobacter turicensis is a bacterium. It is usually food-borne and pathogenic. It is named after Turicum, the Latin name of Zurich, as the type strain originates from there. Its type strain is strain 3032 (=LMG 23827T =DSMZ 18703T). This strain was first isolated from a fatal case of neonatal meningitis. C. Turicensis strains are indole negative but malonate, dulcitol and methyl-α-D-glucopyranoside positive.

References

Further reading

External links 
LPSN

Type strain of Cronobacter turicensis at BacDive -  the Bacterial Diversity Metadatabase

Enterobacteriaceae
Bacteria described in 2007